Summit Grove is an unincorporated community in Helt Township, Vermillion County, in the U.S. state of Indiana.

History
Summit Grove was platted in 1871. A post office was established at Summit Grove in 1871, and remained in operation until it was discontinued in 1911.

Geography

References

Unincorporated communities in Vermillion County, Indiana
Unincorporated communities in Indiana
Terre Haute metropolitan area